Fatima Al-Zahra'a Shbair is a Palestinian photojournalist based in Gaza City, Palestine. She won a Prix de la Ville de Perpignan Rémi Ochlik award by Visa pour l'image in 2021 and a World Press Photo award in 2022.

Life and work 
Shbair is a self-taught photographer born in Gaza in1997. She studied business administration at Al-Azhar University. Her work focuses on documenting the Palestinian - Israeli conflict in Gaza City. Shbair's work has been published by many international publications including The New York Times, The Guardian, Le Figaro, L'Express  and Le Temps.

Awards 

 2017 : Photo Documentary Grand Prix, National Geographic Moments 
 2021 : Prix de la Ville de Perpignan Rémi Ochlik
 2021 : IWMF 2021 Anja Niedringhaus Courage in Photojournalism Award
 2021 : TIME's Top 100 Photos of 2021
 2022 : World Press Photo, Regional winner (Asia), Singles

Group exhibition 

 National Geographic in Dubai 2017

References 

1997 births
Photojournalists
Living people
Palestinian people